Commodore Point is a former Ford manufacturing plant in Jacksonville, Florida. It was located on the banks of the St. John River just below the Mathews Bridge. It occupied the former Bentley Shipyards. The factory began operations in November 1924 building the Ford Model T followed later by the Ford Model A and was closed in 1932, where Ford continued to use the building as a parts distribution center until 1968.

External Links and References
Ford Commodore Point Assembly 
Photograph of Ford Commodore Point Assembly 

List of Ford factories

References

Ford factories